The Dangerous Talent is a lost 1920 silent film  directed by George L. Cox and starring Margarita Fischer and Harry Hilliard. It was released by Pathé Exchange.

Cast
Margarita Fischer - Leila Mead
Harry Hilliard - Gilbert Ellis
Beatrice Van - Mildred Shedd
Harvey Clark - Horton
Neil Hardin - Bob Ames
George Periolat - Peyton Dodge
Mae Talbot - A Derelict

References

External links

 The Dangerous Talent at IMDb.com

1920 films
American silent feature films
Lost American films
Pathé Exchange films
1920s American films